Malus × zumi (or Malus zumi) is a naturally occurring hybrid species of crabapple in the family Rosaceae, native to Japan, and a garden escapee in the US state of Ohio. Its parents are Manchurian crab apple Malus mandshurica and Siebold's crabapple Malus sieboldii. It is used as a salttolerant rootstock for apples, Malus domestica, as it can survive NaCl concentrations up to 0.6%. A number of ornamental cultivars are available, including 'Golden Hornet' and 'Professor Sprenger'.

References

zumi
Crabapples
Ornamental trees
Endemic flora of Japan
Plants described in 1905